Polygyridae is a family of air-breathing land snails, terrestrial pulmonate gastropod mollusks in the superfamily Helicoidea. 

The Polygyridae make up a significant proportion of the land snail fauna of eastern North America, and are also found in western North America, northern Central America, and are present on some Caribbean islands. The definitive reference to the group is Henry Pilsbry's 1940 monograph.

Anatomy
This snail family is distinguished from other gastropods on the basis of several anatomical features: They have no dart apparatus (see love dart), the muscles which allow the eyes and pharynx to be retracted are united into a single band, and the jaws are ribbed.

In this family, the number of haploid chromosomes lies between 26 and 35 (according to the values in this table).

Taxonomy
According to the Taxonomy of the Gastropoda (Bouchet & Rocroi, 2005) this family consists of the following subfamilies and tribes:
Subfamily Polygyrinae Pilsbry, 1895
 tribe Allogonini Emberton, 1995
 tribe Ashmunellini Webb, 1954
 tribe Polygyrini Pilsbry, 1895 
subtribe Mesodontina Tryon, 1866 
 subtribe Polygyrina Pilsbry, 1895 
 subtribe Stenotrematina Emberton, 1995
Subfamily Triodopsinae Pilsbry, 1940

Genera
This family is defined by an absent diverticulum and absent stimulatory organ. The two subfamilies, Polygyrinae and Triodopsinae, are distinguished on the basis of reproductive anatomy. As some species in the subfamily Polygirinae show a penial appendage. This family is monophyletic.

Pilsbry uses the generic names Allogona, Ashmunella, Giffordius, Mesodon, Polygyra, Praticolella, Stenotrema, Trilobopsis, Triodopsis, and Vespericola. The remaining names listed here have either been elevated from Pilsbry's subgenera since 1940, or newly created.

Subfamily Polygyrinae:
 Appalachina
 Daedalochila
 Euchemotrema
 Fumonelix
 Giffordius
 Hochbergellus
 Inflectarius
 Linisa
 Lobosculum
 Mesodon
 Millerelix
 Patera
 Polygyra
 Praticolella
 Stenotrema
 Trilobopsis

Shells of species within the Polygyrinae

Subfamily Triodopsinae:
 Allogona
 Ashmunella
 Cryptomastix
 Neohelix
 Triodopsis
 Vespericola
 Webbhelix
 Xolotrema

Shells of species within the Triodopsinae

References

External links 

 
Taxa named by Henry Augustus Pilsbry
Gastropod families